Yoshimori is both a masculine Japanese given name and a Japanese surname.

Possible writings
Yoshimori can be written using many different combinations of kanji characters. Here are some examples: 

義盛, "justice, prosper"
義守, "justice, protect"
義森, "justice, forest"
佳盛, "skilled, prosper"
佳守, "skilled, protect"
佳森, "skilled, forest"
善盛, "virtuous, prosper"
善守, "virtuous, protect"
善森, "virtuous, forest"
吉盛, "good luck, prosper"
吉守, "good luck, protect"
吉森, "good luck, forest"
良盛, "good, prosper"
良守, "good, protect"
良森, "good, forest"
恭盛, "respectful, prosper"
嘉盛, "excellent, prosper"
嘉守, "excellent, protect"
能盛, "capacity, prosper"
喜盛, "rejoice, prosper"

The name can also be written in hiragana よしもり or katakana ヨシモリ.

Notable people with the given name Yoshimori
, Japanese sumo wrestler
, Mongolian sumo wrestler
, Japanese samurai

Notable people with the surname Yoshimori
, Japanese composer and pianist

Japanese-language surnames
Japanese masculine given names